Omurtag Municipality is a municipality (obshtina) in Targovishte Province, Northeastern Bulgaria, located in the so-called Fore-Balkan area north of the Stara planina mountain. It is named after its administrative centre - the town of Omurtag.

The main road E772 crosses the area connecting its main town with the province centre Targovishte, to the northeast, and the city of Veliko Tarnovo to the west.

Settlements 

Omurtag Municipality includes the following 43 places (towns are shown in bold):

Demography 
The following table shows the change of the population during the last four decades. Since 1992 Omurtag Municipality has comprised the former municipality of Obitel and the numbers in the table reflect this unification.

Ethnic composition
According to the 2011 census, among those who answered the optional question on ethnic identification, the ethnic composition of the municipality was the following:

Demographic indicators 
The municipality of Omurtag had relatively favourable demographic indicators compared to the Bulgarian average. But after 2013, the number of births decreased significantly while the number of deaths increased. Omurtag recorded its lowest birth rate, highest death rate and lowest natural growth in 2017. It was the biggest yearly fall since 2000.

The continued childbirth decline came amid the falling number of women of childbearing age because of emigration to Western Europe (especially Germany and the Netherlands).

Religion
According to the latest Bulgarian census of 2011, the religious composition, among those who answered the optional question on religious identification, was the following:

See also
Provinces of Bulgaria
Municipalities of Bulgaria
List of cities and towns in Bulgaria

References

External links
 Official website 

Municipalities in Targovishte Province